Wanseko, is a settlement in Western Uganda.

Location
Wanseko is located on the eastern shores of Lake Albert, in Buliisa District. The settlement lies at the mouth of the Victoria Nile, at it enters Lake Albert. The coordinates of Wanseko are:2°10'40.0"N, 31°22'50.0"E (Latitude:2.177778; Longitude:31.380556).

Overview
Wanseko lies within Bugungu Wildlife Reserve. It offers opportunity to view various species of exotic bird species. It also supports a small fishing community. The settlement is the northern end of the  Hoima–Butiaba–Wanseko Road. A government-funded transportation ferry crosses the mouth of the river from Wanseko in Buliisa District to Panyimur in Nebbi District, twice daily, six days a week, Mondays through Saturdays.

See also

References

External links

Populated places in Uganda
Cities in the Great Rift Valley
Buliisa District
Bunyoro sub-region
Western Region, Uganda